The following is a list of films produced in Italy in 1910:

External links
 Italian films of 1910 at the Internet Movie Database

1910
Italian
Films